Daniel García-Pérez Guzmán (born 21 September 1972), known commonly as Daniel Guzmán, is a Spanish actor, screenwriter and film director.

Biography 

He grew up in Las Águilas, an area of Madrid, where during his youth he painted graffiti under the pseudonym Tifón, in spite of a large part of the neighbourhood in Aluche being against his paintings. These paintings earned him a certain fame, to the point at which he co-led a docudrama called Mi Firma en las Paredes for the features programme Crónicas urbanas in 1990.

Various consecutive strokes of luck made him decide to dedicate himself full-time to acting. In 1994, Fernando León de Aranoa offered him a character in his short film Sirenas. He later obtained small roles in the films Hola, ¿estás sola? and Puede ser divertido. Shortly afterwards, he headlined the cast of Eso (1997), under the direction of Fernando Colomo, in which Daniel played Domingo, a man in his twenties obsessed over losing his virginity. In 1995 the casting director Sara Bilbatúa took advantage of the image Daniel offered in this film as a representative of a disorientated youth to include him in the cast of Éxtasis, where he played a criminal whose best friend (Rober: Javier Bardem) was confused with the lost son of an older man. His next complete film, Suerte, confirmed this profile, playing Toni, a character who robbed banks to start a new life with his girlfriend.

In his television works in the series Menudo es mi padre (1997), he changed style, taking the role of an exemplary student. After a cameo in Barrio, Daniel gained notable roles in El grito en el cielo and Rewind. In theatre, he starred in Yonquis y yanquis (1996-1997) and Joe Killer (1998).

Daniel returned that year to television in the series Policías, en el corazón de la calle (2000-2003) where he played Rafael, an undisciplined police officer who in his youth had trafficked drugs, and who was obligated to arrest his former friends until he was shot, leaving him paraplegic. Together with Josep Maria Pou, he was nominated for the Fotogramas de Plata awards for best television actor.

In the early 2000s he took up his political activity once again to actively participate in the protests against the Iraq War, during which he was arrested.

In February 2015, he played Lucas in the Antena 3 series Velvet. A year later he received the Goya award for Best New Director for the film A cambio de nada. In 2018 he switched to stage direction for Perfectos desconocidos, written by Paolo Genovese, which he helped adapt.

Filmography (actor)

Film 
 Puede ser divertido (1995) - Mensajero
 Hola, ¿estás sola? (1995) - Novio
 Éxtasis (1996) - Max
 Eso (1997) - Domingo
 Suerte (1996) - Toni
 El grito en el cielo (1998) - Salva
 Una pareja perfecta (1998) - Terry
 Barrio (1998) - Chico bar de copas
 Rewind (1999) - Andrés
 Aunque tú no lo sepas (2000) - Santi Joven
 El sueño del caimán (2001) - Iñaki
 Cuando todo esté en orden (2002) - Pablo
 A golpes (2005) - Fran
 Arena en los bolsillos (2005) - Mateo
 Mia Sarah (2006) - Gabriel
 Mi gran noche (2015) - Policía municipal
 En tu cabeza (2016) - Charli (segment 'Cabra y oveja')
 Bajo el mismo techo (2019) - Álex

Short 
 Sirenas (1994)
 Maika (1994) - Amigo 3.
 Entrevías (1996) - Kike

Television

Theatre 
1989: Sueño de una noche.
1989: La zapatera prodigiosa.
1993: Fronteras.
1993: La dama boba.
1994: Peter Pan.
1996-1997: Yonquis y yanquis.
1998: Joe Killer.
2013-2014: Los miércoles no existen
2015: Recortes
2016: Los tragos de la vida
2017: Dos más dos

Filmography (director) 

 Sueños (2003, short film)
 A cambio de nada (2015)
 Canallas (2022)

Awards and nominations

Goya awards 

 Málaga Film Festival: 
 Golden Biznaga for A cambio de nada, his first film as a director (2015)
 Silver Biznaga for Best Director
 Silver Biznaga: Critic's Prize
 Public Prize (2002)
 Alcalá de Henares Cinema Festival: 
 Public prize of the Certamen Open Screen for A cambio de nada (2015)
 Golden Sprig at the International Festival of Valladolid: Best short film (2002)

References

External links 

 
 
 Interview on winning the Goya Award for "Sueños" (in Spanish)
 Daniel Guzmán feels the fear and the dreams of adolescence (in Spanish)
 'Sueños', from the actor Daniel Guzmán, wins the Guindilla Prize for Best Short Film in the Actual de Logroño (in Spanish)

Graffiti artists
Spanish male television actors
Spanish male film actors
Film directors from the Community of Madrid
Male actors from Madrid
Goya Award winners
1974 births
Living people
20th-century Spanish male actors
21st-century Spanish male actors